Çamlıyayla is a town and district of Mersin Province in the Mediterranean region of Turkey. The district has a population of 10,558 of which 3335 lives in the town of Çamlıyayla.

Çamlıyayla is a small district high in the Taurus Mountains. In summer the lakes, streams and pine forests of Çamlıyayla attract many visitors, people from Adana, Mersin and Tarsus escaping from the extreme heat on the coast to summer homes up in the hills. (see yayla)

Çamlıyayla is a quiet rural area without the wild nightlife to entertain young people and is therefore popular with families and the retired, typically children stay in the hills with their grandparents while their parents are at work in the city; in the school holiday period the population of the district rises to over 100,000. The cuisine includes a slushed ice called karsambaç, which antecessor of icecream, very refreshing in summer.

There is a mountain goat breeding centre in Çamlıyayla and people go there for hunting wild boar, rabbits and sandgrouse. At higher altitudes the district is bare mountainside, above the tree line.

History
The early history of the area is unknown but these hills must have been occupied from the earliest times. By the late 11th century, the area was briefly controlled by the Byzantine empire, but was briefly conquered by the Seljuk Turks in 1081.  Near the edge of the town is the sprawling Hetʽumid castle of Lampron, an Armenian construction of the 11th and 12th centuries, which has a few structural remains from the earlier late antique and Byzantine periods.  The residential chambers at the northwest are especially impressive with their well-cut ashlar masonry.  This site guarded a strategic route from Cappadocia to the Armenian Kingdom of Cilicia. Subsequently, the castle was brought into the Ottoman Empire and was the scene of fighting between the Ottomans and the Mamluks.

References

External links

 District's official website 
 Municipality's official website 
 Carefully documented photographic survey and plan of Lampron Castle/ Çamlıyayla

Populated places in Mersin Province
Yaylas in Turkey
Districts of Mersin Province
Çamlıyayla District
Towns in Turkey